Pangbourne College Boat Club is a rowing club based on the River Thames at  Pangbourne College Boathouse, Shooters Hill, Pangbourne, Berkshire.

History
The boat club is owned by Pangbourne College with rowing being a major school sport.

The club is a leading school rowing club and has won the prestigious Princess Elizabeth Challenge Cup at the Henley Royal Regatta on four occasions and has also won the Queen Mother Challenge Cup at the National Schools' Regatta.

Honours

National Schools' Regatta

Henley Royal Regatta

+ as Nautical College, Pangbourne

British champions

See also
Rowing on the River Thames

References

Sport in Berkshire
Rowing clubs in England
Rowing clubs of the River Thames
Scholastic rowing in the United Kingdom